John W. Walter (born 1966) is an American film maker from Detroit.

Walter directed and edited Theater of War in 2008, a documentary about Bertolt Brecht's life and work that the NY Times' Manohla Dargis called "inspired, inspiring." Walter's first feature-length documentary How to Draw a Bunny won a Special Jury Prize at the Sundance Film Festival in 2002, as well as the Audience Award at the Paris Film Festival in the same year. "Bunny," which Walter edited and directed, also earned him an Independent Spirit nomination, and is distributed by Palm Pictures and Lion's Gate DVD. Walter returned to Sundance in 2007 with a documentary that he edited, Amir Bar-Lev's My Kid Could Paint That, which Sony Classics released in Fall 2007.

Walter wrote, directed and edited an hour-long documentary, "Edison's Miracle of Light," for PBS' "The American Experience" (1995). He produced and edited Thom Powers' film "Guns & Mothers," a documentary investigation of American moms on both sides of the gun control debate, which was featured on the Emmy Award-winning PBS series “Independent Lens" in 2003. For the Sundance Channel and CourtTV, Walter wrote, directed, and edited "Some Assembly Required," a documentary on the police response to the protests surrounding the 2004 Republican National Convention in New York. He has also done television work for WNET, directing and editing for "Egg: The Art Show."

In addition, Walter has directed projects for Comedy Central, the Independent Film Channel, the Sundance Channel, PBS, and the Council of Fashion Designers of America. He now lives and works in New York's East Village.

References

Living people
1966 births